Bianhu was a system of household registration introduced following the Qin unification in 221 BC. The system transformed individual households into a category labelled the "common people listed in the household register".

References

Chinese family registers
Civil registries
Legal history of China